The Venezuelan Olympic Committee or COV ( - COV) was established on 23 December 1935 and recognized by the IOC in the same year. It is a private non-profit organization affiliated with the International Olympic Committee and other sporting associations and governs the conduct of Venezuela's athletes in events sanctioned by the International Olympic Committee (IOC), the Pan American Games and the Central American and Caribbean Games. It is based in Caracas, Venezuela.

History
The Venezuelan Olympic Committee was created on December 23, 1935. and recognized by the International Olympic Committee in the same year.

Executive committee
 President: María Soto
 Vice Presidents: Marcos Oviedo, Joseba Barreda, Pedro León Torres, Pablo Machilanda
 Secretary General: Élida Párraga
 Treasurer: Arturo Castillo
 Directors: María A. Pérez, Ángel Delgado (Machile)
 President of the Honorary Council: Efraín Velásquez

President

See also
 Venezuela at the Olympics
 Venezuela at the Paralympics
 Venezuela at the Pan American Games

References

External links

Venezuela
Olympic
Venezuela at the Olympics
Organizations based in Venezuela
Sports organizations established in 1935